Aanakkalari is a 1978 Indian Malayalam film, directed and produced by A. B. Raj. The film stars Vincent, Sathaar, Unnimary and Jose Prakash in the lead roles. The film has musical score by M. K. Arjunan.

Cast
Vincent
Unnimary 
Jose Prakash 
Sathar
G. K. Pillai 
Kuthiravattam Pappu 
T. P. Madhavan 
Nellikode Bhaskaran 
Jagathy Sreekumar 
K.P.A.C. Sunny 
Prathapachandran

Soundtrack
The music was composed by M. K. Arjunan and the lyrics were written by Sreekumaran Thampi.

References

External links
 

1978 films
1970s Malayalam-language films